Jack the Ripper is a 1988 Anglo-American co-production by Thames Television and CBS television film drama based on the notorious Jack the Ripper murder spree in Victorian London. It was first broadcast on ITV.

The film was produced to coincide with the 100th anniversary of the Whitechapel murders, and was originally screened on British television in two 90-minute episodes, broadcast on consecutive evenings, in October 1988, to coincide with the dates of some of the original events, advertising itself in advance as a solution to the century-old mystery of the murderer's identity using newly discovered original evidence.

Plot
London, autumn 1888. Chief Inspector Frederick Abberline of Scotland Yard is assigned by his superiors to investigate the murder and brutal mutilation of a prostitute in the East End of London. As the mutilated corpses of other "shilling whores" turn up in the same area, London's tabloid journalists – particularly Benjamin Bates of The Star – whip up a public frenzy. The killer is nicknamed "Jack the Ripper" after a letter bearing that name and supposedly from the killer, is forwarded to Scotland Yard. As the Ripper terrorizes London, public outrage erupts throughout the country, and Police Commissioner Sir Charles Warren fears that a revolution is in the air in London's East End.

There is no shortage of suspects for Abberline and his partner, Sergeant George Godley. These suspects include the American actor Richard Mansfield (appearing in the play Strange Case of Dr Jekyll and Mr Hyde in London); police surgeon Dr Henry Llewellyn; socialist agitator George Lusk; Queen Victoria's clairvoyant Robert Lees; the Queen's grandson Prince Albert Victor; and Dr Theodore Dyke Acland, the son-in-law of Sir William Gull, Royal Surgeon to Queen Victoria and expert on diseases of the brain. The police and the authorities want the murders solved at any cost, but Abberline and Godley face huge obstacles as they search for the truth – and hindrance from their superiors when the killer is finally unmasked.

Cast
 Michael Caine – Chief Inspector Frederick Abberline, an aging alcoholic whose quest to solve the murders gives him the strength to give up drinking
 Lewis Collins – Sergeant George Godley
 Armand Assante – Richard Mansfield, American Stage actor in the theatrical play Jekyll and Hyde
 Ray McAnally – Sir William Gull, Physician-in-Ordinary to Queen Victoria 
 Ken Bones – Robert James Lees, Queen Victoria's psychic medium
 Susan George – Catherine Eddowes, fourth victim of Jack the Ripper
 Jane Seymour – Emma Prentiss 
 Harry Andrews – Coroner Wynne Baxter 
 Lysette Anthony – Mary Jane Kelly, fifth and last victim of Jack the Ripper
 Gerald Sim – Dr. George Bagster Phillips
 Hugh Fraser – Commissioner of Police Sir Charles Warren
 Edward Judd – Chief Superintendent of Police Thomas Arnold
 George Sweeney – Coach driver John Netley
 Michael Gothard – George Lusk, Chairman of the Whitechapel Vigilance Committee, and a violent Marxist and power-hungry politician
 T. P. McKenna – T. P. O'Connor, Editor of The Star newspaper
 Jon Laurimore – Inspector John Spratling
 Peter Armitage – Sgt. Kerby
 Richard Morant – Dr. Theodore Dyke Acland, son-in-law of Sir William Gull
 Ronald Hines – Henry Matthews, Home Secretary
 David Swift – Lord Salisbury, Prime Minister
 Jonathan Moore – Benjamin Bates, reporter for the Star
 Michael Hughes – Dr. Llewellyn, Chief Medical Examiner of Whitechapel
 Gary Shail – Billy White, a Whitechapel pimp
 Angela Crow– Elizabeth Stride, third victim of Jack the Ripper
 Marc Culwick – Prince Albert Victor
 David Ryall – Bowyer, Mary Kelly's landlord 
 Gary Love – Derek, a young police officer 
 Kelly Cryer – Annette, a French girl and friend of Mary Jane Kelly  
 Roger Ashton-Griffiths – Rodman, a blind brothel operator in Whitechapel

Production
Jack the Ripper presents a fictionalised portrayal of Frederick Abberline, with details of his personal life (including alcoholism and his relationship with artist "Emma Prentiss") invented via dramatic licence. (In real-life, at the time of the Ripper murders, Abberline was married to Emma Beament, the daughter of a merchant. In Jack the Ripper, Emma Prentiss is not married to Abberline.) Furthermore, the series' portrayal of Abberline unmasking the Ripper as William Gull contradicts the fact that the real-life Abberline believed that the Ripper was actually George Chapman. George Lusk of the Whitechapel Vigilance Committee was depicted in the film as a violent, argumentative troublemaker when in fact he was very quiet, a good local business man who was known for his peaceful nature, a churchwarden and a Freemason. Hugh Fraser wore clothing that his character, Sir Charles Warren, had actually worn. This was both Harry Andrews and Edward Judd's last production. Armand Assante's stand-in died during filming. Of her experience filming Jack the Ripper, Jane Seymour said, "That was fun. I played it as a redhead, it was a great role, and of course I got to work with the great Michael Caine. I had been warned that Michael is tough on actors and actresses unless they know their lines and are very professional, which mostly I was, but they didn’t tell me that he literally liked to do one take and then go and have lunch with his wife. Which is basically what happened! So you’d show up, and unless the [microphone] landed on you or the camera bumped onto you or he messed up, which he never did, that was it. It was one take, and then you’re on to the next. So that was interesting." Michael Caine worked with Jack the Ripper director David Wickes on another television film: the four-hour, two-part Jekyll & Hyde (1990), based on the book by Robert Louis Stevenson. The story of Jekyll and Hyde is a plot-point in Wickes' Jack the Ripper series.

Using historical characters involved in the genuine 1888 hunt for the killer, Jack the Ripper was written by Derek Marlowe and David Wickes and directed by Wickes. The series drew heavily on the same discredited Masonic/Royal Family conspiracy theory as the 1978 film Murder By Decree; it is also the account presented in the 2001 film From Hell. This theory was first put forward in the 1960s by Thomas E. A. Stowell who published his claims in a November 1970 issue of The Criminologist. The theory was later turned into the bestselling Jack the Ripper: The Final Solution (1976) by Stephen Knight. The 1988 series dispenses with the fictional Sherlock Holmes who uncovered the conspiracy in Murder By Decree and instead concentrates on the real-life Whitechapel detective Frederick Abberline, as assisted by Sergeant George Godley.

The series is constructed as a Whodunit in which viewers are led to suspect, at various points, that Prince Albert Victor, Richard Mansfield, George Lusk, Henry Llewellyn or Theodore Dyke Acland could be Jack the Ripper. Before Jack the Ripper was broadcast, director/co-writer David Wickes claimed that he had been allowed unprecedented access to the Scotland Yard files on the Ripper case and stated that his production would be revealing the 'true' identity of Jack the Ripper for the first time. After pressure from Ripperologist Melvin Harris and others, Wickes was forced to withdraw this claim. Nevertheless, the series begins with a disclaimer on behalf of the production staff, stating, "Our story is based on extensive research, including a review of the official files by special permission of the Home Office and interviews with leading criminologists and Scotland Yard officials." The series' "revelation" that Sir William Gull was Jack the Ripper was not new: Stephen Knight's 1976 book alleged that Gull was the Ripper, and prior to that, the theory had been cited in the 1973 BBC TV series Jack the Ripper (two episodes of which were directed by David Wickes). Furthermore, the Ripper character in the film Murder by Decree, assigned the fictitious name "Sir Thomas Spivey," was based on Sir William Gull.

Marlowe and Wickes retained The Final Solutions contention that William Gull was Jack the Ripper, but dispensed with most of the rest of the theory: the involvement of Prince Albert Victor is dismissed as a red herring; there is no mention of Walter Sickert, Annie Crook, an illegitimate Royal baby, blackmail or Freemasons; and the explanation given for the murders is dementia, acquired by Gull from a stroke. The original script adhered more closely to The Final Solution but was changed during the course of production: interviewed in 2017, Jane Seymour stated "when we first got the script, they kind of implicated the Masons as being involved, and by the time we finished the movie, there was pretty much no mention of the Masons."

The series ends with Gull's son-in-law, Dr. Theodore Dyke Acland, theorising that Gull was using himself as a case-study of multiple personality disorder (giving free rein to his murderous impulses in an effort to understand his own multi-faceted mind). The series presents Gull acting of his own accord (with only coachman John Netley complicit in his crimes), and conspiracy only coming into play after Gull's arrest: according to the series, Gull's murders were covered up at the behest of police commissioner Sir Charles Warren to avoid a scandal, as Gull was Queen Victoria's physician. The series' denouement thus differs to Stephen Knight's claim that Warren was aware of the Ripper's identity as the crimes were being committed.

Jack the Ripper ends with the following disclaimer:

The series was originally mounted on a relatively low-budget, with interior photography shot on video-tape and location footage shot on 16-mm film (as was common practice for British television productions of the time). Filming commenced in October 1987, with Barry Foster of Van der Valk cast in the role of Abberline. Production was halted in December 1987 after the American television network CBS became interested in the project, and most of the original cast and crew were paid off.

Jack the Ripper was consequently re-tooled as an Anglo-American co-production with an $11 million budget (provided jointly by Thames Television and CBS), shot entirely on film. It was decided that a more famous actor would be required to headline the series if it was to sell in the United States, so the role of Abberline was recast with the actor Michael Caine – ironically, Foster had earlier replaced Caine in Alfred Hitchcock's Frenzy, when Caine refused to play a serial killer who mutilates women. The casting of Michael Caine was considered to be a major coup, as the actor was not known for doing television work. Jack the Ripper reportedly earned Caine a fee of $1 million.

In the original version of the series, Abberline's partner George Godley was to have been played by Brian Capron. He was replaced by Lewis Collins who was best known as Bodie in the ITV action series The Professionals. American actor Armand Assante and British actress Jane Seymour, both well known to American audiences, were added to the cast at the suggestion of CBS. Ken Bones, George Sweeney, Edward Judd and Kelly Cryer all played the parts they were cast for in the unfinished version of the series.

Jack the Ripper began filming in February 1988, with principal photography at Pinewood Studios. David Wickes was determined that as few people as possible should know who would be unmasked as the killer, and shot four dummy endings (revealing George Lusk, Inspector Spratling, Chief Superintendent Arnold and Sir Charles Warren as the Ripper) to put the cast and crew off the scent. He also mocked up a scene with Godley pulling William Gull from a coach in a case of mistaken identity, and then edited them all together to produce the result. Reportedly, only eight members of Wickes' staff knew the truth before production wrapped.

The series premiered in the UK on 11 October 1988, and in the USA on 21 October 1988. (The original broadcast thus occurred within the timeframe of the centenary of the Ripper's "Canonical Five" murders, 31 August-9 November 1888.) The series enjoyed extremely high ratings on both sides of the Atlantic.

Several DVD editions of Jack the Ripper include, as extra features, audio commentary by director/co-writer David Wickes and production assistant Sue Davies, and twenty minutes of footage from the original shoot starring Barry Foster and Brian Capron. The series was released on Blu-ray on 27 March 2017. This edition features two versions of the series over two discs, the first presenting the series in two parts as originally broadcast and in its original 4:3 aspect. The second disc contains the series as one film and in a 16:9 widescreen aspect. The blu-ray release contains the same extras contained in the previous DVD releases.

British nostalgia television channel Talking Pictures TV aired both episodes on Wednesday 1 and Thursday 2 April 2020, the first time the miniseries was repeated on British television for some years.

Historical accuracy

The film contains several historical inaccuracies:

Inspector Frederick Abberline's name is mis-pronounced for the entirety of the series.  There is also no evidence that he was an alcoholic.

George Lusk is depicted as an anarchist but was in fact a mild-mannered, public spirited man: the patrols he organised were more like modern neighbourhood watch patrols or police organised searches.

Prince Albert Victor is referred to in the film as the Duke of Clarence, when in fact he did not assume that title until May 1890, two years after the murders.

It is stated that Mary Ann Nichols had her uterus removed, but this is untrue as she had no organs missing. Annie Chapman was the first victim to have her uterus removed.

Catherine Eddowes is portrayed as having shared a pimp with Elizabeth Stride and Mary Jane Kelly, as well as having been acquainted with Mary Ann Nichols, however, there is no definitive evidence that any of the victims knew each other. It also seems questionable that either Eddowes or Kelly would have had a pimp. Prostitution was not Eddowes main form of employment, she merely engaged in prostitution as supplemental income if needed; and Kelly had only just resumed her work as a prostitute shortly before the murders began, after her lover Joseph Barnett became unemployed (she had previously worked as a prostitute before she began cohabitating with Barnett).

Emma Prentiss claims that the illustration she has drawn is for The Strand Magazine, when in fact that publication didn't exist until 1891.

A photographer is seen photographing the corpse of Annie Chapman at the murder scene. In reality, photographing a murder scene was not common practice at the time and the body was not photographed until being transferred to the mortuary.

According to their badges, the constables in the film were assigned to 'J' division, whereas Whitechapel was actually 'H' division.

George Godley exclaims that the murderer has cut off the ears of Catharine Eddowes. In reality, her ears were left intact, with only the lobe of one ear being cut through.

The actor Richard Mansfield is portrayed as being American. Although he had his greatest success in America, Mansfield was an Englishman born in Berlin to a Russian mother and an English father.

Bloodhounds are visible at the scene of Mary Jane Kelly's murder in Miller's Court. While the use of bloodhounds was indeed considered and trialed, they were not actually employed during the investigation.
 
When the body of Mary Jane Kelly is discovered, the view of the corpse through the window is incorrect. It is seen as being face on, whereas the body was actually side-on, with the head to the right.

When abberline shows Gull a photograph of the Mary Jane Kelly crime scene, the actual photo of her body is shown.

Susan George, playing prostitute Catharine Eddowes, is clad in a fashionable and expensive 'Bustle' dress. This garment would have been far beyond the means of women like Eddowes.

Frederick Abberline is depicted as having been transferred to Whitechapel as a form of punishment for his alcoholism. In fact, Abberline was reassigned to field work from Scotland Yard due to his intimate knowledge of the area, having previously worked as the local Inspector for Whitechapel for fourteen years from 1873 to 1887.

Reception

Awards
Jack the Ripper was nominated for the following awards:

Emmy −1989- Outstanding Supporting Actor in a Miniseries or a Special: Armand Assante Nominated
Golden Globe −1989- Best Performance by an Actor in a Mini-Series or Motion Picture Made for TV: Michael Caine Won (Award Tied)
Golden Globe −1989- Best Performance by an Actor in a Supporting Role in a Series, Mini-Series or Motion Picture Made for TV: Armand Assante Nominated

See also
Murder by Decree
From Hell (film)

References

External links

Review on Eofftv.com

1988 British television series debuts
1988 British television series endings
1980s British drama television series
1980s British television miniseries
American biographical series
ITV television dramas
Films set in 1888
Television series about Jack the Ripper
Television series by Warner Bros. Television Studios
Films shot at Pinewood Studios
Television series by Fremantle (company)
Television shows produced by Thames Television
Television series produced at Pinewood Studios
English-language television shows
Television series by Euston Films
Television shows set in London